Hebron Christian Academy (HCA) is a private, co-educational, college preparatory Christian school in Dacula, Georgia, United States. Founded in 1984 as the Northeast Atlanta Christian School, Hebron has grown from a small handful of students to a student body of over 1100.

History 
The Northeast Atlanta Christian Church was founded by the Rev. Lance Sperring in 1984, which opened in 1985 serving 90 students, kindergarten through grade twelve. 

In 1999, Hebron Baptist Church purchased Northeast Atlanta Christian School. The name was subsequently changed to Hebron Christian Academy. Classes are offered for K through twelfth grade in a traditional classroom setting.

Athletics 
The Hebron Lions compete in the Georgia High School Association as a AAA school. The girls' basketball team won the 2020-2021 GHSA Class A Private State Championship.

References

Baptist schools in the United States
Christian schools in Georgia (U.S. state)
Educational institutions established in 1984
Preparatory schools in Georgia (U.S. state)
Schools in Gwinnett County, Georgia
Private high schools in Georgia (U.S. state)
Private middle schools in Georgia (U.S. state)
Private elementary schools in Georgia (U.S. state)
1984 establishments in Georgia (U.S. state)